The 1935–36 Detroit Red Wings season was the tenth season for the Detroit franchise in the National Hockey League (NHL) and the fourth operating as the Red Wings. Under head coach Jack Adams, the Red Wings compiled a 24–16–8 record, finished first in the American Division, and won the Stanley Cup championship. The Wings scored 124 goals, second most in the NHL, and gave up 103 goals by opponents.  The team played its home games at Olympia Stadium in Detroit.

In the Stanley Cup semifinals, the Wings defeated the Montreal Maroons, three games to zero. The first game of the series was the longest ice hockey game ever played. The game began at 8:30 p.m. at the Forum in Montreal, and ended at 2:25 a.m. when Mud Bruneteau scored in the sixth overtime period.

In the 1936 Stanley Cup Finals, the Wings defeated the Toronto Maple Leafs, three games to one.  The Stanley Cup championship was the first in Detroit franchise history.

Defenceman Doug Young was the team captain.  The team's statistical leaders included Marty Barry with 21 goals and 40 points scored, Herbie Lewis with 23 assists, and Ebbie Goodfellow with 69 penalty minutes. Barry's 40 points were the second most in the NHL during the 1935-36 season; his 21 goals were third most in the league. Normie Smith was the team's goaltender in all 48 games. Smith's 24 wins as goaltender and 3,030 minutes played led the NHL during the 1935-36 season.

Four members of the team have been inducted into the Hockey Hall of Fame: Ebbie Goodfellow (inducted in 1963); Syd Howe (inducted 1965); Marty Barry (inducted 1965); and Herbie Lewis (inducted 1989).

Regular season

Final standings

Record vs. opponents

Schedule and results

Player statistics

Forwards
Note: GP = Games played; G = Goals; A = Assists; Pts = Points; PIM = Penalty minutes

Defencemen
Note: GP = Games played; G = Goals; A = Assists; Pts = Points; PIM = Penalty minutes

Goaltending
Note: GP = Games played; MIN = Minutes; W = Wins; L = Losses; T = Ties; SO = Shutouts; GAA = Goals against average

Playoffs

(C1) Montreal Maroons vs. (A1) Detroit Red Wings

Detroit wins best-of-five series 3–0.

Toronto Maple Leafs vs. Detroit Red Wings

Detroit wins best-of-five series 3–1.

References

Bibliography

External links
Red Wings on Hockey Database

Detroit Red Wings seasons
Detroit
Detroit
Stanley Cup championship seasons
Detroit Red Wings
Detroit Red Wings